Greenshields is a surname. Notable people with the surname include:

Allan Greenshields (born 1926), Australian rules footballer
Clint Greenshields (born 1982), Australian rugby league player
Frank Greenshields (born 1941), English cricketer
Joel Greenshields (born 1988), Canadian swimmer
Karen Greenshields, Scottish television presenter
R.A.E. Greenshields (1861–1942), Canadian judge

See also
Greenshields Peak, a mountain of Graham Land, Antarctica
Greenshields, Alberta, a hamlet in Alberta, Canada